This list contains all cultural property of national significance (class A) in the canton of St. Gallen from the 2009 Swiss Inventory of Cultural Property of National and Regional Significance. It is sorted by municipality and contains 77 individual buildings, 14 collections, 20 archaeological finds and 1 other, special sites or objects.

The geographic coordinates provided are in the Swiss coordinate system as given in the Inventory.

Altstätten

Amden

Andwil

Au

Bad Ragaz

Balgach

Berg

Berneck

Buchs

Bütschwil-Ganterschwil

Degersheim

Ebnat-Kappel

Eggersriet

Eschenbach

Flawil

Flums

Gaiserwald

Goldach

Gommiswald

Gossau

Grabs

Hemberg

Kirchberg

Lichtensteig

Lütisburg

Marbach

Mels

Mörschwil

Muolen

Neckertal

Nesslau

Niederbüren

Niederhelfenschwil

Oberriet

Oberuzwil

Pfäfers

Rapperswil-Jona

Rheineck

Rieden

Rorschach

Rorschacherberg

Rüthi

Sargans

Schänis

Schmerikon

St. Gallen

St. Margrethen

Steinach

Thal

Tübach

Untereggen

Uzwil

Waldkirch

Walenstadt

Wartau

Wattwil

Weesen

Wil

Wildhaus-Alt St. Johann

Wittenbach

References
 All entries, addresses and coordinates are from:

External links
 Swiss Inventory of Cultural Property of National and Regional Significance (KGS 2009 edition):

KGS Class B properties + objects
Geographic information system

 01
Culture of the canton of St. Gallen
History of the canton of St. Gallen
Buildings and structures in the canton of St. Gallen
Buildings and structures in St. Gallen (city)
.01
St. Gallen (city)
Tourist attractions in the canton of St. Gallen
Tourist attractions in St. Gallen (city)